Women in rock describes the role of women singers, instrumentalists, record producers and other music professionals in rock music and popular music and the many subgenres and hybrid genres that have emerged from these genres. Women have a high prominence in many popular music styles as singers. However, professional women instrumentalists are uncommon in popular music, especially in rock genres such as heavy metal. "[P]laying in a band is largely a male homosocial activity, that is, learning to play in a band is largely a peer-based... experience, shaped by existing sex-segregated friendship networks. As well, rock music "...is often defined as a form of male rebellion vis-à-vis female bedroom culture."

Overview

In popular music, there has been a gendered "distinction between public (male) and private (female) participation" in music. "[S]everal scholars have argued that men exclude women from bands or from the bands' rehearsals, recordings, performances, and other social activities." "Women are mainly regarded as passive and private consumers of allegedly slick, prefabricated – hence, inferior – pop music..., excluding them from participating as high status rock musicians." One of the reasons that there are rarely mixed gender bands is that "bands operate as tight-knit units in which homosocial solidarity – social bonds between people of the same sex... – plays a crucial role." In the 1960s pop music scene, "[s]inging was sometimes an acceptable pastime for a girl, but playing an instrument...simply wasn't done."

"The rebellion of rock music was largely a male rebellion; the women—often, in the 1950s and '60s, girls in their teens—in rock usually sang songs as personæ utterly dependent on their macho boyfriends...". Philip Auslander says that "Although there were many women in rock by the late 1960s, most performed only as singers, a traditionally feminine position in popular music". Though some women played instruments in American all-female garage rock bands, none of these bands achieved more than regional success. So they "did not provide viable templates for women's on-going participation in rock". In relation to the gender composition of heavy metal bands, it has been said that "[h]eavy metal performers are almost exclusively male" "...[a]t least until the mid-1980s" apart from "...exceptions such as Girlschool." However, "...now [in the 2010s] maybe more than ever–strong metal women have put up their dukes and got down to it", "carv[ing] out a considerable place for [them]selves."
When Suzi Quatro emerged in 1973, "no other prominent female musician worked in rock simultaneously as a singer, instrumentalist, songwriter, and bandleader". According to Auslander, she was "kicking down the male door in rock and roll and proving that a female musician ... and this is a point I am extremely concerned about ... could play as well if not better than the boys".

A number of these artists are also notable for singing and songwriting, but they are listed here for their instrumental skills:
Joni Mitchell
Bonnie Raitt
Nancy Wilson (of Heart)
Kaki King
Orianthi
Sister Rosetta Tharpe
Jennifer Batten
Mary Ford
Lita Ford
Joan Jett
 Janet Gardner (of Vixen)
 Kim McAuliffe (of Girlschool)
 Carla Olson (of the Textones. also a guitar player, songwriter and producer)

All-female bands and girl groups
An all-female band is a musical group in popular music genres such as rock, blues, jazz and related genres which is exclusively composed of female musicians. This is distinct from a girl group, in which the female members are solely vocalists, though this terminology is not universally followed. While all-male bands are common in many rock and pop bands, all-female bands are less common.

A girl group is a music act featuring several female singers who generally harmonize their vocals together. The term "girl group" is also used in a narrower sense within English-speaking countries to denote the wave of American female pop music singing groups which flourished in the late 1950s and early 1960s between the decline of early rock and roll and the British Invasion, many of whom were influenced by doo-wop style. All-female bands are sometimes also called girl groups.

1930s–1960s
In the Jazz Age and during the 1930s, all-female bands such as The Blue Belles, the Parisian Redheads (later the Bricktops), Lil-Hardin's All-Girl Band, The Ingenues, The Harlem Playgirls, Phil Spitalny's Musical Sweethearts and "Helen Lewis and Her All-Girl Jazz Syncopators" were popular. Ina Ray Hutton led an all-girl band, the Melodears, from 1934 to 1939.  Eunice Westmoreland, under the name Rita Rio, led an all-female band appearing on NBC Radio and for Vitaphone and RKO. Ivy Benson's "All Girls Band" was the BBC's resident dance band in 1943 and toured until the 1980s.  A Polish group Filipinki was established in 1959.

Groups composed solely of women began to emerge with the advent of rock and roll. Among the earliest all-female rock bands to be signed to a record label were Goldie & the Gingerbreads, to Atlantic Records in 1964, The Pleasure Seekers with Suzi Quatro to Hideout Records in 1964 and Mercury Records in 1968. There is also a band formed with 4 girls from Indonesia, Dara Puspita formed in 1964. The Feminine Complex to Athena Records in 1968, and Fanny (who pioneered the all-female band sound in the early to mid-1970s) in 1969 when Mo Ostin signed them to Warner Bros. Records.  There were also others, such as The Liverbirds (1962–1967), the Ace of Cups (1967), The Heart Beats (1968), and Ariel (1968–1970).

1970s–1980s
In 1971 Fanny became the first all-female band to reach the Hot 100's top 40, with "Charity Ball" peaking at No. 40. In 1975, the Canadian duo of sisters, Kate and Anna McGarrigle, recorded the first of a string of albums. The Runaways were an early commercially successful, hard-edged, all-female hard rock band, releasing their first album in 1976: band members Joan Jett, Cherie Currie and Lita Ford all went on to solo careers. The 1980s, for the first time, saw long-sought chart success from all-female bands and female-fronted rock bands.  On the Billboard Hot 100-year-end chart for 1982 Joan Jett's I Love Rock 'n' Roll at No. 3 and the Go-Go's We Got the Beat at No. 25 sent a message out to many industry heads that females who could play could bring in money.

Punk

In the United Kingdom, the advent of punk in the late 1970s with its "anyone can do it" ethos led to women making significant contributions. In contrast to the rock music and heavy metal scenes of the 1970s, which were dominated by men, the anarchic, counter-cultural mindset of the punk scene in mid- and late 1970s encouraged women to participate. "That was the beauty of the punk thing," Chrissie Hynde later said." [Sexual] discrimination didn't exist in that scene." This participation played a role in the historical development of punk music, especially in the U.S. and U.K. at that time, and continues to influence and enable future generations.

Rock historian Helen Reddington states that the popular image of young punk women musicians as focused on the fashion aspects of the scene (fishnet stockings, spiky blond hair, etc.) was stereotypical. She states that many, if not most women punks were more interested in the ideology and socio-political implications, rather than the fashion. Music historian Caroline Coon contends that before punk, women in rock music were virtually invisible; in contrast, in punk, she argues "[i]t would be possible to write the whole history of punk music without mentioning any male bands at all – and I think a lot of [people] would find that very surprising." Johnny Rotten wrote that 'During the Pistols era, women were out there playing with the men, taking us on in equal terms ... It wasn't combative, but compatible.' Women were involved in bands such as The Slits, The Raincoats, Mo-dettes, Dolly Mixture, and The Innocents.

Others take issue with the notion of equal recognition, such as guitarist Viv Albertine, who stated that "the A&R men, the bouncers, the sound mixers, no one took us seriously.. So, no, we got no respect anywhere we went. People just didn't want us around." The anti-establishment stance of punk opened the space for women who were treated like outsiders in a male-dominated industry. Sonic Youth's Kim Gordon states, "I think women are natural anarchists, because you're always operating in a male framework."

Heavy metal

The all-female heavy metal band Girlschool, from South London, formed in 1978 out of the ashes of Painted Lady. While somewhat successful in the UK, they became better known in the early 1980s. One of the original members of the band, Kathy Valentine departed to join the all-female band The Go-Go's, switching from guitar to bass. Among Girlschool's early recordings was an EP titled "The St. Valentines Day Massacre" which they recorded with Bronze label-mates Motörhead under the name Headgirl. In 1974, The Deadly Nightshade, a rock/country band, was signed by Phantom.

1990s–2000s
In the 1990s, musician's magazines were starting to view female musicians more seriously, putting Bonnie Raitt and Tina Weymouth on their covers. While The Go-Go's and The Bangles, both from the LA club scene, were the first all-female rock bands to find sustained success, individual musicians paved the way for the industry to seek out bands that had female musicians.

In the 1990s, bands such as Hole, Babes in Toyland, Super Heroines, The Lovedolls and L7 became popular, while demonstrating on stage, and in interviews, a self-confident and  "bad" attitude at times, always willing to challenge assumptions about how an all-female band should behave. Courtney Love described the other females in Hole as using a more "lunar viewpoint" in their roles as musicians. In the 1990s, the punk, female-led Riot Grrrl genre was associated with bands such as Bratmobile and Bikini Kill.

References

Women in music
Popular music
Rock music